Department of Treasury, Bureau of Alcohol, Tobacco and Firearms v. Galioto, 477 U.S. 556 (1986), was a United States Supreme Court case.

Background 
Generally, convicted felons and mental patients are prohibited from purchasing firearms in the United States. A federal statute,  allowed some felons to appeal to the BATF to restore their rights to purchase firearms. At that time, prior mental patients did not have a similar route to restore their right to purchase firearms. The appellee argued that this was unreasonable and discriminatory.

Between the time that the Court agreed to hear Galioto, and the time that the case was heard, PL 99-308 was signed into law, allowing former mental patients to appeal to restore their rights to purchase firearms, rendering the case moot.

References

External links
 

United States Supreme Court cases
United States Second Amendment case law
1986 in United States case law
Bureau of Alcohol, Tobacco, Firearms and Explosives
Mental health law in the United States
United States Supreme Court cases of the Burger Court